Hernán Escudero Martínez is an Ecuadorian diplomat and professor. 

He was born in Quito, Ecuador (5 May 1946). During his tenure in Geneva, Escudero served as chairman of the Executive Committee of the UNHCR. He holds a Master of Arts degree in International Relations from the Fletcher School of Law and Diplomacy. Escudero has been awarded the Order of the Sun of Peru and the Order of Bernardo O'Higgins both in the degree of Grand Cross.

References 

1946 births
People from Quito
Living people
The Fletcher School at Tufts University alumni
Ambassadors of Ecuador to Peru